NA-3 Swat-II is a constituency for the National Assembly of Pakistan. The constituency was known as NA-29 (Swat-I) from 1977 to 2018, the name was changed to NA-3 (Swat-II) after the delimitation in 2018 and tehsil Kabal was carved out of it to create NA-4 (Swat-III) where it joined tehsil Matta to make up that constituency.

Members of Parliament

1977–2002: NA-29 (Swat-I)

2002–2018: NA-29 (Swat-I)

Since 2018: NA-3 (Swat-II)

Election 2002

General Elections were held on 10 October 2002. Qari Abdul Baees Siddiqui won this seat with 65,808 votes.

Election 2008

General Elections were held on 18 February 2008. Muzafer ul Mulk won this seat with 19,860 votes.

Election 2013

General Elections were held on 11 May 2013. Murad Saeed won this seat with 88,513 votes.

Election 2018

General elections were held on 25 July 2018.

Contest overview
Pakistan Tehreek-e-Insaf's candidate Salim Rehman had been elected member of National Assembly previously from NA-30 (Swat-II) (now NA-2 (Swat-I)) and he was up against former Chief Minister (CM) of Punjab Shehbaz Sharif who is also the president of Pakistan Muslim League (N) and has been CM Punjab thrice. Muttahida Majlis-e-Amal initially considered Hujjatullah as its candidate but decided not to field him in support of Sharif. Disagreeing with that, Hujjatullah decided to run independently. Rehman also ran in the 2002 election as a Pakistan Peoples Party Parliamentarians candidate from NA-30 (Swat-II) and then in 2008 from this very constituency which was then NA-29 (Swat-I), losing both times.

Results

By-election 2023 
A by-election will be held on 19 March 2023 due to the resignation of Salim Rehman, the previous MNA from this seat.

See also
NA-2 Swat-I
NA-4 Swat-III

References

External links 
Election result's official website

3
3